The Adventures of the Little Prince is an anime series based on the book by Antoine de Saint-Exupéry.  Made by the animation studio Knack Productions, the series, originally titled , aired in Japan on the TV Asahi network from July 1978 to March 1979.  Dubbed into English, the series premiered in the United States in 1985 on Nickelodeon and was rerun through June 1, 1985 to December 29, 1989. It was also broadcast on TVOntario throughout the 1980s beginning in 1985, a station that would later pick up the dub of the 2010 French adaptation. Yoshikazu Yasuhiko, of Mobile Suit Gundam fame, was involved in this series as a director.

In total there were 26 episodes aired in English, with 39 episodes made for the original Japanese run.  On July 17, 2017, it was announced that Discotek Media has picked up the North American license for the anime.  In May and December of that same year, Discotek Media has uploaded a Japanese language with English subtitles of the first episode on Youtube, all 39 episodes of the Japanese language version with English subtitles on Crunchyroll.

According to The Anime Encyclopedia by Jonathan Clements and Helen McCarthy, only the first 35 episodes were actually aired on Japanese TV; the remaining four episodes remained unreleased until the series was reissued on video.

Plot 
The series followed the Little Prince as he travels on a comet from his home planet, B-612, to Earth. He lands in Europe and embarks on a journey across the continent, where he helps various people along the way.

The premise was altered for the English version. It had the Little Prince traveling to Earth and planets that resembled it and returning home at the end of each episode, and helped people at the various places he went to. In addition to the premise, episode plots were also altered.  Ever since Discotek Media acquiring the anime license in North America, all 39 episodes can now be watched on Crunchyroll in Japanese with English subtitles.

Episodes

Voices

Additional English Voices
Jack Angel
Peter Cullen
Walker Edmiston
Robert Ridgely
Janet Waldo
Pamela Ziolowski

DVD releases 
On September 6, 2005, Koch Vision released a 4-disc DVD of the entire English series in Region 1. Koch Vision has subsequently begun releasing the series in Volumes each containing 3 or 4 episodes each, which sell at a lower cost than the complete series.

Discotek Media released all 26 episodes of the English dub on DVD on October 31, 2017. On December 6, 2017, Discotek Media uploaded the first episode of the Japanese version with English subtitles to YouTube, and on May 16, 2019, the entire Japanese version was added to Crunchyroll.  The anime will also make its debut on Retrocrush.

In September 2019, the English dub of the series was made available on Amazon Prime.

See also 

 List of The Little Prince adaptations, a listing of The Little Prince story adapted into various media.
 The Little Prince (1974 film), a 1974 musical film directed by Stanley Donen
 The Little Prince (2015 film), a 2015 computer-animated fantasy film directed by Mark Osborne
 The Little Prince (play), a theatrical adaptation
 The Little Prince (opera), an opera in two acts by Rachel Portman to an English libretto by Nicholas Wright
 The Little Prince and the Aviator, a 1981 musical theatre adaptation
 Antoine de Saint-Exupéry category listing of articles

Notes

References 

 Citations

 Bibliography

 The Encyclopedia of Animated Cartoons, 2nd ed.
 The Anime Encyclopedia: A Guide to Japanese Animation Since 1917, by Jonathan Clements and Helen McCarthy

External links 
 
 
 
 Danya y Little Prince on toonarific.com

1978 anime television series debuts
Adventure anime and manga
Works based on The Little Prince
Aviation television series
Discotek Media
Fantasy anime and manga
Knack Productions
Television shows based on children's books
1980s Nickelodeon original programming